Preity Zinta is an Indian actress known for her work in Hindi films. She made her debut in 1998 with a supporting role in the drama Dil Se... Later that year, she starred in the commercially successful thriller Soldier. For the films, she won a Filmfare Award in the Best Female Debut category. In 1999, Zinta played the role of a CBI officer in the psychological thriller Sangharsh. She followed this with the role of a teenage single mother in the Kundan Shah-directed drama Kya Kehna (2000), a sleeper hit. That same year, she starred in the romance Har Dil Jo Pyar Karega, and the crime drama Mission Kashmir, the third highest grossing Bollywood film of the year.

In 2001, Zinta featured in the dramedy Dil Chahta Hai, which is cited in the media as a defining film of Hindi cinema. Later that year, she portrayed a prostitute-turned-surrogate in the romantic drama Chori Chori Chupke Chupke. Her only screen appearance of 2002 was in the box-office flop Dil Hai Tumhaara. Zinta featured in four films in 2003. Her first role of the year was opposite Sunny Deol in Anil Sharma's drama The Herothe most expensive Bollywood film to that point. She played a negative role in the romantic drama Armaan, which saw her portray a rich, schizophrenic woman. Following this, she starred in two blockbusters—the science fiction film Koi... Mil Gaya and the drama Kal Ho Naa Ho. For the latter, she won the Filmfare Award for Best Actress.

Zinta played a journalist in the 2004 war drama Lakshya, which performed poorly at the box-office. Also in 2004, she played the titular female role in Yash Chopra's star-crossed romance Veer-Zaara opposite Shah Rukh Khan. The film emerged as the year's highest grossing Bollywood film. She then appeared in the 2005 romantic comedy Salaam Namaste and the 2006 romantic drama Kabhi Alvida Naa Kehna, both of which performed well outside India. While she played a radio jockey in Salaam Namaste, Zinta was seen as an unhappily married woman in the latter. She followed it with roles in the commercial failures Jaan-E-Mann (2006) and Jhoom Barabar Jhoom (2007). Zinta appeared in the Canadian film Heaven on Earth (2008), her first international production.

In 2011, Zinta hosted the reality show Guinness World Records – Ab India Todega and the chat show Up Close & Personal with PZ. That same year, she also launched her production company, PZNZ Media, under which she produced and starred in the 2013 romantic comedy Ishkq in Paris, which performed poorly at the box-office.

Films

Television

See also
 List of awards and nominations received by Preity Zinta

References

External links 

 

Indian filmographies
Actress filmographies